Searching for Zero is the fifth studio album by the Canadian hardcore punk band Cancer Bats. It was released on 10 March 2015 and was recorded in Ross Robinson's studio in Venice Beach, California.

Track listing

Personnel
Cancer Bats
 Liam Cormier – lead vocals
 Scott Middleton – guitar
 Mike Peters – drums, percussion
 Jaye R. Schwarzer – bass guitar

Additional personnel
 Ross Robinson – production

References

2015 albums
Cancer Bats albums